Kostermansia malayana, commonly known as the durian tuang or krepal, is a species of flowering plant in the mallow family, Malvaceae, that is endemic to Peninsular Malaysia. It is threatened by habitat loss.

References

External links

Helicteroideae
Endemic flora of Peninsular Malaysia
Trees of Peninsular Malaysia
Vulnerable plants
Monotypic Malvales genera
Taxonomy articles created by Polbot
Malvaceae genera